Mumbra is a railway station on the Central line of the Mumbai Suburban Railway network.

Most of the fast locals coming from Kalyan or from Mumbai bypass through the Parsik Tunnel which is 1.3 km in length and it was once the third largest tunnel of Asia. This tunnel lies on the fast track and has one entry and one exit point in Mumbra. It is the first railway tunnel that was built in India and is more than hundred years old, by the British Empire. It is in the Sahyadri Ranges of Maharashtra and those hills are known as Parsik Hills 

An addition of railway lines has been built from Kalwa to Diva which passes through Ulhas River has been constructed and Started from mid-January 2022. Similarly two new platforms 1 and 2 have been constructed. The new alignment has creek bridges at either ends of the station.

References

Railway stations opened in 1865
Mumbai CST-Kalyan rail line
Railway stations in Thane district
Mumbai Suburban Railway stations